Jordan Johnson (born 9 October 1986) is a professional footballer who plays as a forward for Congleton Town. Born in England, he represented the British Virgin Islands national football team.

International career

International goals
Scores and results list British Virgin Islands' goal tally first.

References

External links

Caribbean Football Database profile

1986 births
Living people
Leek Town F.C. players
British Virgin Islands footballers
British Virgin Islands international footballers
Congleton Town F.C. players
Newcastle Town F.C. players
AFC Telford United players
Chasetown F.C. players
Northwich Victoria F.C. players
Airbus UK Broughton F.C. players
Kidsgrove Athletic F.C. players
Footballers from Stoke-on-Trent
Association football forwards
North West Counties Football League players